The Delta do Parnaíba Marine Extractive Reserve is a coastal marine extractive reserve in the states of Maranhão and Piauí, Brazil.

Location

The Delta do Parnaíba Marine Extractive Reserve is divided between the municipalities of Araioses (99.57%) in Maranhão and Ilha Grande (3.84%) in Piauí.
It is contained within the Delta do Parnaíba Environmental Protection Area.

History

The Delta do Parnaíba Marine Extractive Reserve  was created by federal decree on 16 November 2000.
It is administered by the Chico Mendes Institute for Biodiversity Conservation (ICMBio).
It is classed as IUCN protected area category VI (protected area with sustainable use of natural resources).
An extractive reserve is an area used by traditional extractive populations whose livelihood is based on extraction, subsistence agriculture and small-scale animal raising.
Its basic objectives are to protect the livelihoods and culture of these people and to ensure sustainable use of natural resources.

On 10 November 2005 the reserve was recognised as supporting 2,000 families, who would qualify for PRONAF support.

Notes

Sources

 

Marine extractive reserves of Brazil
Protected areas of Maranhão 
Protected areas of Piauí
Protected areas established in 2000
2000 establishments in Brazil